Lee Han-guk is a South Korean footballer who last played for Shan United.

Career statistics

Club

Notes

References

1987 births
Living people
South Korean footballers
South Korean expatriate footballers
Association football midfielders
Lee Han-guk
Myanmar National League players
Lee Han-guk
Shan United F.C. players
Expatriate footballers in Thailand
South Korean expatriate sportspeople in Thailand
Expatriate footballers in Myanmar
South Korean expatriate sportspeople in Myanmar